Czechówka may refer to:

Czechówka, Lesser Poland Voivodeship, Poland
Czechówka, Lublin Voivodeship, Poland

See also
Czechowo (disambiguation)
Czechów (disambiguation)
Czechowicz